kandukuri Veeresalingam (16 April 1848  27 May 1919) was a social reformer and writer from the Madras Presidency, British India. He is considered as the father of the Telugu Renaissance movement. He was one of the early social reformers who encouraged the education of women and the remarriage of widows (which was not supported by society during his time). He also fought against child marriage and the dowry system. He started a school in Dowlaiswaram in 1874, constructed the 'Brahmo Mandir' in 1887 and built the 'Hithakarini School' in 1908 in Andhra Pradesh. His novel Rajasekhara Charitramu is considered to be the first novel in Telugu literature.

He is often considered Raja Ram Mohan Roy of Andhra. He was known by the title Gadya Tikkana, or ‘the Tikkana of Prose'.

Early life  
Kandukuri veeresalingam was born into a Telugu speaking family in Rajahmundry, Madras Presidency, to Subbarayudu and Poornamma. When he was six months old, he had smallpox, a dangerous disease during that time, and when aged four his father died. He was adopted by his paternal uncle, Venkataratnam. After studying in an Indian street school, he was sent to English medium school where his talent was recognised. His good nature and studiousness earned him the best student award in his school. He completed his matriculation in 1869 and got his first job as a teacher in Korangi village.

Literature 
Veeresalingam was a scholar in Telugu, Sanskrit, and Hindi. Considering literature as an instrument to fight against social evils, his writings also reflected the same. He wrote plays such as Prahlada(1886) and Satya Harischandra (1886). He published a novel Rajashekhara Charita in 1880, originally serialised in Viveka Chandrika from 1878. Generally recognised as the first Telugu novel, it is inspired by The Vicar of Wakefield, a novel by the Irish writer 

His works include:
 'Rajasekhara Charitra', first novel in Telugu
 'Viveka Vardhini', a journal for women education in 1887.
 'Satihita bodhini', a monthly magazine for women.
 the first drama in Telugu and first book in Telugu on sciences & history.

Brahmo Samaj 
Kandukuri Veeresalingam was inspired by the principles of Brahmo Samaj leaders like Raja Rammohan Roy, Pandit Ishwar Chandra Vidyasagar, & Keshab Chandra Sen. He started Andhra Pradesh's first Brahmo Mandir in Rajahmundry in 1887.

Social reformer

Supporting Women 
One of the greatest reforms of Veeresalingam was to promote women's education, which was a taboo in those days. In 1876, he started a journal called Viveka Vardhini and published articles about women's issues of that aera. The magazine was initially printed in Chennai (then Madras), but with his writings gaining popularity, he established his own press at Rajahmundry.

Remarriage of widows was not appreciated in the society during those days, and he opposed this practice by quoting verses from the Hindu Dharma Sastra to prove his point. His opponents used to organise special meetings and debates to counter his arguments, and even resorted to physical violence against him when they failed to stop him. Undeterred, Veeresalingam started a Remarriage Association and sent his students all over Andhra Pradesh to find young single men willing to marry widows. He arranged the first widow remarriage on 11 December 1881. For his reformist activities, Kandukuri gained attention all over the country. The Government, in appreciation of his work, conferred on him the title of Rao Bahadur in 1893. Later he established a home for widows.

Politics
Kandukuri Veeresalingam was one of the attendees of the first Indian National Congress (INC) meeting in 1885.

Personal life 
Kandukuri Veeresalingam was married to Bapamma Rajyalakshmi in 1861. At the time of marriage, he was 14 years old and she was 9.

Death 

Veeresalingam died on 27 May 1919 at the age of 71. His statue has been unveiled on the Beach Road in Vishakhapatnam. In his memory, the Indian Postal service issued a 25-paisa postage stamp in 1974.

References

External links

 
 Sweeyacharitramu, Part-1, An autobiography of Kandukuri Veeresalingam on archive.org

1848 births
1919 deaths
Brahmos
Hindu revivalists
Indian social reformers
Telugu writers
Writers from Andhra Pradesh
People from Rajahmundry
20th-century Indian educational theorists
19th-century Indian educational theorists
Activists from Andhra Pradesh
Indian women's rights activists